Hillcoat is a surname.

People with this name include:

Chris Hillcoat (born 1969), Scottish football player and coach (Hamilton Academical)
John Hillcoat (born 1961), Australian film director, screenwriter and music video director
John Hillcoat (footballer) (born 1970), Scottish football goalkeeper